The Las Vegas metropolitan area is the metropolitan area encompassing the Las Vegas Valley in Clark County, Nevada, United States.

The Las Vegas metropolitan area may also refer to:
 The Las Vegas–Paradise, NV MSA, the official Metropolitan Statistical Area for Las Vegas, Nevada
 The Las Vegas, New Mexico micropolitan area, United States

See also
Las Vegas (disambiguation)